Klettermaxe is a 1952 West German comedy crime film directed by Kurt Hoffmann and starring Liselotte Pulver, Albert Lieven and Charlott Daudert. It is a remake of a 1927 silent film about a cat burglar who steals from other thieves and a young Cuban dancer who becomes fascinated by him.

It was shot at the Wandsbek Studios in Hamburg. The film's sets were designed by Willi Herrmann and Heinrich Weidemann. It was a major commercial success on release, and helped to cement Pulver's reputation as a leading star.

Cast

References

Bibliography 
 Bock, Hans-Michael & Bergfelder, Tim. The Concise Cinegraph: Encyclopaedia of German Cinema. Berghahn Books, 2009.

External links 
 

1952 films
1950s crime comedy films
West German films
1950s German-language films
Films directed by Kurt Hoffmann
Remakes of German films
Films based on German novels
Superhero comedy films
German vigilante films
German crime comedy films
Films set in Hamburg
Films shot at Wandsbek Studios
1952 comedy films
German black-and-white films
1950s German films